Amelia Jenae Leles (born January 28, 1987) is an American, former collegiate All-American, softball third basemen. She attended Rio Americano High School and the University of Arizona, winning two titles with the Wildcats during her years playing from 2006 to 2009. With United States women's national softball team she won 2011 World Cup of Softball. Jenae was named to the 2012 Women's National Team. She was also drafted #6 in the National Pro Fastpitch.
USA Softball

Arizona
Leles, as a freshman, helped the Wildcats to a sixth NCAA title, including driving in the game-winning runs off Monica Abbott in the semifinals on June 4, 2006. She was shut out at the plate during the finale against the Northwestern Wildcats. As a sophomore, she made her second finals appearance and once again drove in the decisive runs against Abbott to capture a second championship in her career and the seventh for the school on June 6, 2007. She would be named All-Tournament for her efforts. In 2008, she would nab her first All-Pac-12 Conference honor. During her senior year, Leles earned National Fastpitch Coaches Association Second Team recognition and a second conference citation. On March 29, she hit her 50th career home run in a win over the Oregon Ducks. She made her final appearance on May 30, 2009, totaling two hits in a loss to the Alabama Crimson Tide on May 30.

Personal
Jenae is currently living in Sacramento, Ca. She gives personal softball lessons and also runs Camps and Clinics locally and throughout the Nation.

Statistics

References

External links 
 
 
 USA Softball

1987 births
Living people
Arizona Wildcats softball players
Softball players at the 2011 Pan American Games
Sportspeople from Sacramento, California
Softball players from California
Pan American Games medalists in softball
Pan American Games gold medalists for the United States
Medalists at the 2011 Pan American Games